N-(1-Naphthyl)ethylenediamine is an organic compound. It is commercially available as part of Griess reagents, which find application in quantitative inorganic analysis of nitrates, nitrite and sulfonamide in blood, using the Griess test.

Preparation
This compound can be prepared by the reaction of 1-naphthylamine with 2-chloroethanamine. It is commercially available as the dihydrochloride salt.

Properties
N-(1-Naphthyl)ethylenediamine undergoes most reactions typical to naphthylamine and primary amines such as diazotation. Similar to its analog ethylenediamine, it can also act as a bidentate ligand to give several coordination compounds. However, it is a weaker bidentate ligand as the nitrogen atom in the naphthylamine group is weakly coordinating due to the dispersal of charge by resonance. For example, it reacts with potassium tetrachloroplatinate in aqueous solution to give (N-1-naphthyl-ethylenediamine)-dichloroplatinum(II).

Uses
N-(1-Naphthyl)ethylenediamine dihydrochloride is widely used in the quantitative analysis of nitrate and nitrite in water samples by colorimetry. It readily undergoes a diazonium coupling reaction in the presence of nitrite to give a strongly colored azo compound. Sample containing nitrite ions is first neutralized and then treated with dilute hydrochloric acid at 0 - 5 °C to give nitrous acid. Then an excess but fixed volume of sulfanilamide and N-(1-naphthyl)ethylenediamine dihydrochloride solution is added. With nitrous acid as the limiting reagent, the azo coupling reaction produces an azo dye quantitatively with respect to the nitrite ions:

The diazo compound formed accounts for the red coloration typical for a positive result. The color intensity of the resulting solution is then measured by a colorimeter and checked against a calibration curve to determine the nitrite ion concentration.

To analyze nitrate concentrations quantitatively, the sample is first passed through a copper-cadmium column to reduce the nitrate ions quantitatively to nitrite ions, and the above procedure can be employed. However, the result should be adjusted for the nitrite ions present in the original sample.

This method can be applied in many aspects, including determining the nitrate/nitrite concentrations in sewage or other biological samples such as intracellular fluids, given that the sample is clear and colorless.

In a similar protocol, the levels of sulfonamide in blood can be detected similarly with the same principles.

References

Naphthylamines